Reyshawn Antonio Terry Sr. (born April 7, 1984) is an American professional basketball player for Vaqueros de Bayamon of the Puerto Rican Baloncesto Superior Nacional (BSN). He played college basketball for North Carolina.

College career
At the University of North Carolina at Chapel Hill, Terry played  on the North Carolina Tar Heels men's basketball team and helped Carolina win the 2005 NCAA Championship as a sophomore. As a junior in 2005–06, Terry averaged a career high 14.3 points per game.

Terry graduated from UNC in May 2007 with a B.A. in African-American studies.

Professional career 
Terry was drafted in the second round, 44th overall, by the Orlando Magic in the 2007 NBA draft. He was traded on draft day by the Magic to the Mavericks for the rights to the 60th overall pick, Milovan Raković, and cash.

On August 26, 2007, he agreed to a contract with Aris BC of Greece's A1 league. In the summer of 2008, Terry played in the Rocky Mountain Revue summer league for the Dallas Mavericks, and then shortly after joined Italian club Virtus Bologna for the upcoming season. With Bologna, Terry reached the quarterfinals of the FIBA Euro Challenge.

In the 2009-10 Terry played for Xacobeo Blu:Sens, which was promoted to the Spanish ACB for the 2009–10 season, after having spent years in the second division LEB.

Terry played for the Portland Trail Blazers in the NBA Summer League in 2010.

In August 2010 he signed with German Club Brose Baskets. For the following season, he signed with BC Khimik in Ukraine. The 2012-13 season he played for Champville SC in Lebanon.

In September 2013, he signed a one-year deal with Le Mans.

In October 2014, he signed with Tadamon Zouk of Lebanon. In March 2015, he left Tadamon and signed with Maratonistas de Coamo of Puerto Rico. In May 2015, he signed with Trotamundos de Carabobo of Venezuela for the rest of the 2015 LPB season. In June 2015, he signed with the Cañeros de La Romana of Dominican Republic for the 2015 LNB season.

On November 8, 2016, Terry signed with Japanese B.League club Ryukyu Golden Kings for the 2016–17 season.

On September 8, 2017, Terry signed with the Ulsan Mobis Phoebus of the Korean Basketball League.

On April 18, 2018, Terry signed with Piratas de Quebradillas of the Puerto Rican BSN. On August 28, 2018 Terry was named the BSN Most Valuable Player for the 2018 season.

References

External links
FIBA.com Profile
ACB Player Profile
Eurobasket.com Profile

1984 births
Living people
African-American basketball players
American expatriate basketball people in the Dominican Republic
American expatriate basketball people in France
American expatriate basketball people in Germany
American expatriate basketball people in Greece
American expatriate basketball people in Italy
American expatriate basketball people in Japan
American expatriate basketball people in Lebanon
American expatriate basketball people in South Korea
American expatriate basketball people in Spain
American expatriate basketball people in Ukraine
American expatriate basketball people in Venezuela
American men's basketball players
Aris B.C. players
Basketball players from Winston-Salem, North Carolina
BC Khimik players
Brose Bamberg players
Changwon LG Sakers players
Greek Basket League players
Le Mans Sarthe Basket players
Liga ACB players
North Carolina Tar Heels men's basketball players
Obradoiro CAB players
Orlando Magic draft picks
Piratas de Quebradillas players
Power forwards (basketball)
Ryukyu Golden Kings players
Small forwards
Trotamundos B.B.C. players
Ulsan Hyundai Mobis Phoebus players
Vanoli Cremona players
Virtus Bologna players
21st-century African-American sportspeople
20th-century African-American people